Evci is a village in the District of Ayaş, Ankara Province, Turkey.

References

Villages in Ayaş District